Busitema University (BU) is a university in Uganda. It is one of the eight public universities and degree-awarding institutions in the country.

BU has its main focus on the instruction of agricultural sciences, agricultural mechanization, and agribusiness.

Location
The coordinates of the university's main campus are 0°32'42.0"N, 34°01'30.0"E (Latitude:0.5450; Longitude:34.0250).

University campuses
The campuses of BU include the following:
  Main campus in Busia District - Faculty of Engineering (Busitema) - 
 Jinja campus - Non-operative - 
 Nagongera campus in Tororo District - Faculty of Science and Education - 
 Mbale campus in Mbale District - Faculty of Health Sciences - 
 Kaliro campus in Kaliro District - Non-operative - 
 Pallisa campus in Pallisa District  
 Arapai campus in Soroti District - Faculty of Agriculture and Animal Sciences - 
 Namasagali campus in Kamuli District - Faculty of Natural Resources and Environmental Sciences -

Academics
, the university offered the following courses:

Undergraduate degree courses

Faculty of Science and Education
Bachelor of Science Education in computer studies - 3 years - Nagongera campus
Bachelor of Science Education in physics - 3 years - Nagongera campus
Bachelor of Science Education in mathematics 3 years - Nagongera campus
Bachelor of Science Education in education - 3 years - Nagongera campus

Faculty of Agriculture and Animal Sciences
Bachelor of Animal Production and Management - 3 years - Arapai campus
Bachelor of Science in Agriculture - 4 years - Arapai campus
Bachelor of Agribusiness - 3 years - Arapai campus

Faculty of Engineering
Bachelor of Science in agricultural mechanization & irrigation engineering - 4 years - Main campus
Bachelor of Science in computer engineering - 4 years - Main campus
Bachelor of Science in water resources engineering - 4 years - Main campus
Bachelor of Science in polymer, Textile and Industrial Engineering - 4 years  - Main campus
Bachelor of Science in mining engineering - 4 years - Main campus
Bachelor of Science in Ago-processing Engineering- 4 years- main campus

Faculty of Natural Resources and Environmental Sciences
Bachelor of Science in natural resources economics - 3 years - Namasagali campus
Bachelor of Science in hydrology - 4 years - Namasagali campus

Bachelor of Science in Fisheries and Water Resource Management - 3 years - Namasagali campus

Faculty of Health Sciences
Bachelor of Medicine and Bachelor of Surgery - 5 years - Mbale campus, Mbale Regional Referral Hospital 
Bachelor of Science in Nursing - 3 years - Mbale campus, Mbale Regional Referral Hospital

Undergraduate diploma courses

Faculty of Agriculture and Animal Sciences
 Diploma in Agricultural Engineering - 2 years - Busitema campus
 Diploma in Ginning Engineering - 2 years - Busitema campus
 Diploma in Animal Production and Management - 2 years - Arapai campus
 Diploma in Crop Production and Management - 2 years - Arapai campus
 Diploma in electronics and electrical engineering  - 2  years - Busitema campus

Undergraduate certificate courses
 Faculty of Agriculture and Animal Sciences
 Certificate in General Agriculture - 2 years - Arapai campus

Postgraduate courses
The university currently offers three postgraduate programs.
 Faculty of Health Sciences
 Masters of Medicine, Internal Medicine - 3 years - Mbale campus, Mbale Regional Referral Hospital
 Masters of Public Health - 2 years Mbale campus, Mbale Regional Referral Hospital
Faculty of Science and Education
Masters of Educational Leadership and Management

See also
Agriculture in Uganda
Education in Uganda
List of universities in Uganda
List of hospitals in Uganda

References

External links
 Busitema University Homepage
 Busitema University to Spearhead Textile Research in Uganda

 
Agriculture in Uganda
Busia District, Uganda
Public universities
Educational institutions established in 2007
2007 establishments in Uganda
Engineering universities and colleges in Uganda